Askerton Castle is a medieval fortified manor house in Cumbria, England.

History

Askerton Castle was built in the parish of Askerton in Cumbria around 1290. Originally the castle was an unfortified manor, but in the late-15th century Thomas Lord Dacre, the second Baron, built two crenellated towers on either end of the hall range, probably with the aim of increasing the living space in the property rather than simply for reasons of defence. A third tower may have been built on the north-west corner of the property, this time for defensive purposes, but has since been lost. The castle was renovated by architect Anthony Salvin in the 1850s.

Askerton Castle is a Grade I listed building.

See also

Grade I listed buildings in Cumbria
Listed buildings in Askerton
Castles in Great Britain and Ireland
List of castles in England

References

Bibliography
Emery, Anthony. (1996) Greater Medieval Houses of England and Wales, 1300-1500: Northern England. Cambridge: Cambridge University Press. .

Castles in Cumbria
Grade I listed buildings in Cumbria